The Ordnance QF 25-pounder Short was an Australian variant of the British Ordnance QF 25-pounder field gun/howitzer. The gun was developed by modifying the 25-pounder's design to improve its mobility during jungle warfare. Development began in 1942, and the weapon first entered service with the Australian Army the next year. It was used by several Royal Australian Artillery regiments during fighting in the South West Pacific Area, before being declared obsolete in 1946.

The development of the Ordnance QF 25-pounder Short was an important achievement for Australia's defence industry, and provided the Army with a weapon suited to conditions in the South West Pacific. Nevertheless, the gun's performance was inferior to that of the standard 25-pounder, and it received a mixed reception from artillerymen.

Background
The Australian Army began to be equipped with British-built 25-pounder guns in 1940. The gun proved successful, and was the standard equipment of Australian field batteries by 1943. In January 1940, the Australian Government approved a proposal to build 25-pounders in Australia. A Government-owned factory was constructed at Maribyrnong in Melbourne and commercial industry was contracted to produce additional guns. Almost all the guns' components were manufactured in Australia, with almost 200 firms providing parts. The first Australian-built 25-pounder was completed in May 1941 and 1,527 guns were delivered before production ceased at the end of 1943.

The 25-pounder was well suited to the open conditions the Army experienced in the Mediterranean and Middle East theatres but proved difficult to deploy in jungle terrain. While the developed road network in Malaya allowed it to be moved by vehicles during the Malayan Campaign, the extremely rugged terrain and limited transport infrastructure in New Guinea meant that the guns could only be moved away from coastal plains and airfields by manhandling. As a result, Australian infantry often had no artillery support heavier than 3 inch mortars during the New Guinea Campaign in 1942.

Design
The difficulty of deploying artillery in New Guinea led to a need for a gun which could be broken down into light parts and transported by aircraft or jeeps. The Army had only a small number of British 3.7-inch mountain howitzers, and Australia's request for United States M116 75mm pack howitzers was not immediately filled. 

In September 1942, the Army's Director of Artillery, Brigadier John O'Brien, suggested that a variant of the 25-pounder be developed to meet this requirement. This proposal was approved, and all development work was conducted in Australia by the Army, the Ordnance Production Directorate and Charles Ruwolt Pty Ltd. O'Brien produced the early design diagrams himself. The three organisations cooperated closely as they were strongly motivated to provide the Army with a useful light artillery piece as quickly as possible. Design work began in September 1942, and an acceptable weapon was ready by January the next year. Preparations to manufacture the gun commenced while it was still being designed. This violated the Army's usual procedures for fielding new weapons, but proved successful. During the period the 25-pounder Short was under development, the Army received thirty-eight 75mm pack howitzers and deployed some to New Guinea.

The new gun used as many standard 25-pounder parts as possible, but included a number of major differences to reduce the weapon's weight. The historian Ian V. Hogg described these changes as "radical surgery". Modifications included shortening the gun's barrel and recuperator, making the trail lighter, fitting smaller wheels, replacing the platform which allowed the gun to be rotated with a large spade and incorporating the new recoil system which had been developed to allow 25-pounders to be mounted in the Australian-designed Sentinel tank. During testing it was found that the shortened barrel meant that the muzzle flash burned the recoil system. A flash shroud was added to the muzzle of the gun to solve this problem.

This range could be extended to  if a super charge was used, though standing instructions warned against doing so except in emergencies due to the strain they placed on the gun carriage. The gun could fire the same variety of ammunition as the standard 25-pounder; namely high explosive, armour piercing, smoke, gas, propaganda and illumination shells. While the prototype gun was fitted with a gun shield, this was later removed and not incorporated into the production weapons.

The QF 25-pounder Short incorporated a number of features to increase its mobility. The gun could be broken down into 13 or 14 parts in under two minutes, allowing it to be air-dropped from aircraft or packed into Willys MB "jeeps". Assembled guns could also be towed by a Jeep, which was advantageous as it was possible to transport these vehicles inside of aircraft. The gun carriage was very different from that in the standard 25-pounder, and included a new cradle, trail and axles. The guns were initially fitted with stabilisers to reduce stress on their wheels when firing, but these were later removed as they caused problems when reversing or running up the guns in action.

Initial testing of the prototype QF 25-pounder Short was completed in early December 1942. The 2/1st Field Regiment also trialled the gun in New Guinea during early 1943.

Large-scale production began in early 1943, and the Army placed an initial order for 112 guns. A second order was later placed for 100 more. This lot incorporated the Mark II carriage, which had larger wheels and tyres to prevent the problem with wheel bounce encountered by the first lot. Altogether, 213 guns were manufactured by the time production ceased in 1944. As completed, the gun's full designation was Ordnance QF 25-pounder Short (Aust) Mark I, but it was nicknamed the 'snort' by Australian soldiers.

The British Army evaluated the QF 25-pounder Short and a similar design was ordered. It had a different recoil system to the Australian guns to allow super charge to be used, and was designated the Ordnance QF 25-pounder Mark IV. Design work was completed in May 1945, by which time there was no longer a need for the gun. One or two were produced and the British Army declared the type obsolete in 1946.

Service

QF 25-pounder Short guns were first issued to front line artillery regiments in August 1943 as part of the reorganisation of the Australian Army's fighting units to the "Jungle division" structure. Under this structure, one of each field regiment's three batteries was re-equipped with the new guns. Field batteries equipped with the guns normally consisted of a headquarters and two troops each with four guns, seven jeeps and a D6 tractor. Like the standard 25-pounder, each gun had a crew of six men. The commander of New Guinea Force's artillery, Brigadier L.E.S. Barker, preferred the 75mm pack howitzer to the 25-pounder Short, and tried to prevent the new gun being issued. He was overruled by O'Brien. Barker accepted this decision. 

The guns were first used by the 7th Division during the landing at Nadzab, when a 32-man detachment of the 2/4th Field Regiment was dropped by parachute from five C-47 transports with two guns. One gun was assembled and ready to fire within an hour, but the buffer and recuperator of the other took two days to locate in the long grass. The guns did not see action during this operation as no Japanese were in the Nadzab area.

The 9th Division's 2/7th Field Regiment employed the 25-pounder Short in combat for the first time during the Landing at Lae and subsequent operation to capture Lae township. The guns were disliked by some of the gunners due to their inaccuracy and strong muzzle blast. The 9th Division's staff officers regarded the weapon as a success, as it could be readily transported on small vehicles, boats and sledges. Jeeps proved to be unsuitable as gun tractors, however.

From June 1944 the artillery complement of each of the jungle divisions was increased from one to two field regiments. Each regiment continued to comprise two batteries equipped with standard 25-pounders and one with short 25-pounders. The QF 25-pounder Short was used by some Australian artillery units in New Guinea, the Solomon Islands and Borneo until the end of the war. During the Battle of Pearl Ridge in Bougainville a battery of eight 25-pounder Shorts from the 4th Field Regiment supported the advice until the infantry advanced beyond the range of these guns. They were then replaced by standard 25-pounders which the personnel of the regiment's three batteries crewed in rotation. A battery of QF 25-pounder Shorts was the first artillery ashore during the 7th Division's landing at Balikpapan in Borneo on 1 July 1945.

The QF 25-pounder Short was declared obsolete in 1946 and removed from service. The Army's regular units continued to use the standard QF 25-pounder until the early 1960s and reserve units retained the guns until 1975.

Assessments

The QF 25-pounder Short received a mixed reception from gunners, and was particularly unpopular among members of AIF artillery units which had used the standard 25-pounder during the fighting in the Middle East. The lack of a gun shield and the shortened barrel exposed gun crews to a severe backblast each time the gun was fired. As a result, gunners often suffered mild concussions and nosebleeds by the end of fire missions. Guns were sometimes put out of action by damage caused by the absorption of violent recoil. The gun also had a tendency to tilt at low elevation; this was remedied by its crew standing on the trails, an expedient that had previously been used with the QF 4.5 inch Howitzer. Other limitations included a low rate of fire (three or four rounds per minute) and difficulties towing the weapon. Concerns were also raised over the quality of workmanship, and the commander of the 2/4th Field Regiment rejected a batch of Short 25-pounders sent to his unit before the Nadzab operation in the belief that they had been poorly manufactured. Inspectors subsequently concluded that most of his criticisms were unfounded, however. The most important deficiency compared to the regular 25-pounder was the shorter range. As a result of its experience with the gun, the 9th Division recommended that they be pooled and reserved for their special role rather than be employed in a day-to-day role alongside the regular 25 pounder.

Post-war assessments of the gun's performance are generally positive. The Australian official history acknowledged the QF 25-pounder Short's limitations, but argued that these were the result of it being developed to perform a specialised role for which some trade-offs in performance were needed, and that on balance it was a successful weapon. Historian and retired Major General Steve Gower has assessed the gun as being "undoubtedly one of the more significant Australian weapon developments of the Second World War" as it represented a success in adapting a foreign-designed weapon to meet the Australian Army's requirements. Similarly, Australian historian Adrian Threlfall noted the shortcomings of the gun, but stated that its rapid development and introduction into service provides an example of the Army's success in adapting to the demands of jungle warfare. Jeffrey Grey also judged that the gun "was not a perfect weapon, but a compromise born of an urgent situation". British historian Chris Henry has written that the QF 25-pounder Short "gave good service, and was robust enough to survive life in the jungle even though many modifications were needed".

Surviving examples

Several QF 25-pounder Shorts remain existent. One is on display at the Australian War Memorial in Canberra. Two form part of a war memorial in Mordialloc, a suburb of Melbourne. Other examples are preserved at Manly in Sydney, Eugowra, New South Wales, The Army Museum Bandiana, Nyah, Victoria and the Australian Armour and Artillery Museum at Cairns.

References

Citations

Works consulted

 
 
 
 
 
 
 
 
 
 
 
 
 

88 mm artillery
World War II field artillery
World War II artillery of Australia
Pack artillery